SGSecure is a national movement in Singapore. It was launched by Prime Minister Lee Hsien Loong on 24 September 2016 to prepare the public in the event of a terrorist attack.

Mr Lee said the Government has stepped up its measures against terrorism, but its efforts alone are not enough. "Terrorism threatens not just our physical safety, but also our social harmony and way of life," he said. "To protect ourselves, every Singaporean has to play his part."

"SGSecure gives everybody a role in protecting ourselves, our families and our country," he added. "SGSecure will teach you the skills you need to do so."

Awareness
Most Singaporeans think the likelihood of a terrorist attack in Singapore is “not high”, and a “major effort” is necessary to prepare them in the event of such an attack, said Minister for Law K Shanmugam.

There is a need to bring Singaporeans’ awareness to the “next level”: What their role is and how to respond in such a situation, he added.

Eye Power
A promotional advertisement video has appeared on social media:
Spot It Stop It: Rush Hour: Eye Power takes on a whole new meaning.

References

External links
 

Terrorism in Singapore
2016 establishments in Singapore